Orlando Sanchez Mercado (born Orlando Mercado y Sanchez; April 26, 1946), better known as Orly Mercado, is a Filipino politician and broadcast journalist best known for having served as a senator of the Philippines from 1987 to 1998, Secretary of Defense from 1998 to 2001, and for his long career as a broadcast journalist, most famously for hosting the television program Kapwa Ko Mahal Ko.

Career

Early career and Martial Law Imprisonment 
Mercadio's career in Radio broadcasting began when he got a job as Disc Jockey for the program Night Life on Manila FM Station  DZXX. He then became an ABS-CBN journalist in 1969, taking on roles as a reporter for The World Tonight, and for the Radyo Patrol show on ABS CBN's sister radio station DZAQ (now DZMM).

He was the head and anchor of the popular radio program Radyo Patrol of ABS-CBN from 1969 to 1971 as well as the field reporter for pre-Martial Law days in The World Tonight. Upon Marcos' Proclamation No. 1081 in 1972, Orly was charged for subversion under Republic Act 1700 (Anti-Subversion Law) and was detained in Fort Bonifacio then his release after nine and a half months in detention, he returned to broadcasting and started teaching.

Kapwa Ko Mahal Ko 
Since 1975 Mercado has been the current producer and host of GMA Network's Kapwa Ko Mahal Ko (I Love My Fellowmen), the pioneer television program in public service in the Philippines.

Senator of the Philippines 
Mercado ran and won as a senator of the Philippines for two consecutive terms, first in 1987 until 1992, and then again from 1992 to 1998.

As Senator, among the measures he authored are:
Generics Drug and Medicines Act of 1988 (R.A. 6675)
An Act establishing provincial centres for Science and Technology (R.A. 6959)
Magna Carta for Disabled Persons (R.A. 7277)
Consumer Act of the Philippines (R.A. 7394)
An Act promoting Salt Iodization nationwide (R.A. 8172)
An Act promoting voluntary blood donation, providing for an adequate supply of safe blood, regulating blood banks, providing penalties for violations thereof (R.A. 8180)
Children’s Media Act of 1996 (R.A. 8370)
Philippine National Police Reform Act (R.A. 8851)

Secretary of National Defense 
In 1998, he was appointed Secretary of National Defense by President Joseph Estrada. On January 19, 2001, the Chief of Staff and all of the commanding generals of the Armed Forces of the Philippines, together with the rest of the military establishment, withdrew their support for President Estrada who was then facing impeachment for plunder and corruption. Their appearance before a throng of protesters at the EDSA Shrine was the culmination of what was to be known as EDSA People Power II (Second EDSA Revolution), which ousted President Estrada from office. Mercado was reappointed Secretary of Defense by incoming President Gloria Macapagal Arroyo but resigned the post in protest of the designation of a former Chief of Staff as National Security Adviser who was also the subject of Mercado's anti-corruption campaign in the Department of National Defense.

As Secretary/Minister of Department of National Defense, he:
Instituted a reorganization program in the Department of National Defense to assert civilian supremacy over the military
Initiated reforms in the Retirement and Separation Benefit Systems (RSBS), the pension fund of the soldiers
Instituted a computerization program for the Philippine Veterans Affairs Office (PVAO)
Pioneered the use of electronic technology for procurement of equipment and supplies of the Armed Forces of the Philippines

Attemped Senate Comebacks 
In the 2001 Senate election, Mercado ran as an independent candidate under the Pwersa ng Masa Coalition but he failed to win a seat. In 2004, he ran again as a member of Lakas–CMD and Gloria Macapagal Arroyo's coalition, K4 but once again failed to win a seat.

Ambassadorial positions 
In 2008, Gloria Macapagal Arroyo nominated Mercado as Philippine ambassador to the China (People's Republic of China), also accredited to North Korea (Democratic People's Republic of Korea) and Mongolia. However, his nomination was rejected by Senator Jinggoy Estrada (son of President Estrada), then a member of the Commission on Appointments.

In 2009, he was appointed as the first permanent representative of the Philippines to ASEAN, a newly created ambassadorial post which did not then require Commission on Appointments approval.

As the Philippines' first Permanent Representative to the Association of Southeast Asian Nations (ASEAN), he:
Led efforts in the Committee of Permanent Representatives (CPR) to introduce transparency and accountability in the ASEAN Secretariat by way of extensive budget hearings.
Initiated ASEAN's strategic communication plan, which could create a level of awareness and understanding about the regional organization as an imperative in the effort to create an ASEAN Community by 2015.

EROPA Secretary General 
He Mercado currently the Secretary-General of the Eastern Regional Organization for Public Administration (EROPA), an organization of states, groups and individuals in the general area of Asia and the Pacific.

Teaching and return to broadcasting 
He has taught courses in Public Administration and Communication in the University of the Philippines where he obtained all his degrees: Bachelor of Arts in Political Science, Master of Arts in Communication, and Doctor of Philosophy in Political Science. He is also a faculty member at the Ateneo de Manila University School of Government. On June 17, 2013, he returned to radio broadcasting with his program "Orly Mercado: All Ready" on Radyo Singko 92.3 NewsFM.

Personal life and family
Mercado's wife, Dr. Susan Pineda-Mercado, the highest-ranking Filipino woman in the World Health Organization (WHO), was named Special Envoy for Global Health Initiatives by the government of the Philippines in 2018. 

She was also the Philippine nominee for WHO Regional Director for the Western Pacific, a post which will be elected in the Sixty-ninth session of the Regional Committee for the Western Pacific, 8–12 October in Manila, Philippines.

Filmography

Television

Radio

References

1946 births
Living people
Filipino Protestants
Filipino journalists
Filipino democracy activists
Radio Philippines Network people
ABS-CBN News and Current Affairs people
RPN News and Public Affairs people
GMA Integrated News and Public Affairs people
GMA Network personalities
Secretaries of National Defense of the Philippines
Senators of the 10th Congress of the Philippines
Senators of the 9th Congress of the Philippines
Senators of the 8th Congress of the Philippines
Majority leaders of the Senate of the Philippines
Members of the House of Representatives of the Philippines from Quezon City
PDP–Laban politicians
People from Manila
Laban ng Demokratikong Pilipino politicians
Estrada administration cabinet members
Arroyo administration cabinet members
Members of the Batasang Pambansa
University of the Philippines Diliman alumni
Academic staff of Ateneo de Manila University